Shin Dong-yeol (born December 18, 1980), better known by his stage name Bill Stax (Hangul: 빌스택스), previously known as Vasco (바스코), is a South Korean rapper. He was a contestant on Show Me the Money 3. He released his first album, The Genesis, on July 13, 2004.

Discography

Studio albums

Extended plays

Mixtapes

Charted singles

References

1980 births
Living people
South Korean male rappers
South Korean hip hop singers
South Korean hip hop record producers
21st-century South Korean  male singers